A banjo dulcimer is an Appalachian dulcimer modified by adding a vibrating membrane to the body of the instrument.  This changes the tone and volume of the instrument, operating on the same principle as the banjo.

Homer Ledford, a luthier during the early part of the revival of the dulcimer, built several banjo dulcimers, which he called the dulcijo (a portmanteau of dulcimer and banjo).

Makers of banjo dulcimers
Doug Thomson (banjomer.com) has been producing banjo dulcimers since 1980 - called "Banjo-Mer"
McSpadden Dulcimers began producing banjo dulcimers in the early 2000s.
Mike Clemmer produces a banjo dulcimer called "ban-jammer"
Dennis DenHartog (folknotes.com) has been building a solid frame banjo dulcimer called the "Banj-Mo" since spring, 2001.

See also
Banjo mandolin
Banjo ukulele
Banjo guitar
Guitjo

References

Banjo family instruments
Box zithers